The Salta Identity Party (PAIS) is a provincial political party in the Salta Province of Argentina. It was founded by Gustavo Sáenz ahead of the 2015 general election; Sáenz has been governor of Salta since 2019.

The party was a member of the United for a New Alternative alliance until 2017, when it aligned itself with Cambiemos. It supported Roberto Lavagna and former Salta governor Juan Manuel Urtubey's 2019 unsuccessful presidential run; since then it has distanced itself from any national alliances. The party counts with representation – but no majorities – in both houses of the Salta provincial legislature. It counts with no representation at the federal level.

Its logo, adopted ahead of the 2019 gubernatorial elections, is a stylized poncho salteño. The party's use of the traditional poncho led to a legal dispute with an ally party, Salta Unites Us (SNU), that also used a stylized poncho as part of its image. The dispute was settled by the province's Electoral Tribunal, which sentenced in favor of PAIS and ruled both parties could freely use the poncho as their logo.

Electoral results

Chamber of Deputies

Senate

Salta governorship

References

Provincial political parties in Argentina
Political parties established in 2015
2015 establishments in Argentina
Peronist parties and alliances in Argentina